Plains are flat, sweeping landmasses. 

Plains or The Plains may also refer to:

Places
Great Plains, sometimes simply "the Plains", in America and Canada

United States
Plains, Georgia
Plains, Kansas
Plains, Michigan
Plains, Montana
Plains Airport
Plains, Pennsylvania
Plains, Texas
Plains, Borden County, Texas
Plains Township, Luzerne County, Pennsylvania
The Plains, Ohio
The Plains, Virginia

Elsewhere
Plains, North Lanarkshire, Scotland
The Plains, New South Wales, Australia

Other uses
 Plains (album), by  George Winston, 1999
 Plains (band), the country music duo of Jess Williamson and Waxahatchee
 Plains Indians, indigenous tribes living on the Great Plains

See also

Plain (disambiguation)